Allenby is a surname of English origin. Notable people with the surname include:

Edmund Allenby, 1st Viscount Allenby (1861–1936), British Army field-marshal
 Named for the above:
Allenby Street, Tel Aviv, Israel 
Allenby Bridge between Jordan and West Bank. 
Allenby Square, name given in succession to two squares in Jerusalem
Allenby Camp, site of a former British Army camp in Jerusalem
Allenby Garden in Beersheba
 Foch-Allenby, neighborhood in Beirut Central District
Allenby, British Columbia, Canada (adjacent Allenby Lake was named for the town, not Lord Allenby)
 Allenby Junior public school, Toronto, Ontario, Canada
Braden Allenby (born 1950), American environmental scientist
Cecil Allenby (1873–1932), English cricketer
Dudley Allenby, 2nd Viscount Allenby (1903–1984), British soldier
Jim Allenby (born 1982), Australian cricketer
Kate Allenby (born 1974), British modern pentathlete
Michael Allenby, 3rd Viscount Allenby (1931–2014), British soldier
Nicholas Allenby SSM (1909-1995), Anglican bishop in Malaysia
Peggy Allenby (1901–1966), American silent film, television and radio actress
Robert Allenby (born 1971), Australian golfer
Allenby Chilton (1918–1996), English footballer
Allenby Beardsley, fictional character in Japanese anime television series Mobile Fighter G Gundam

A common variant is "Allanby":
Nick Allanby (born 1957), Australian cricketer
Richard Allanby (born 1971), Australian cricketer

Notes

Surnames of English origin